In mathematics, a symmetric Boolean function is a Boolean function whose value does not depend on the order of its input bits, i.e., it depends only on the number of ones (or zeros) in the input. For this reason they are also known as Boolean counting functions.

There are 2n+1 symmetric n-ary Boolean functions. Instead of the truth table, traditionally used to represent Boolean functions, one may use a more compact representation for an n-variable symmetric Boolean function: the (n + 1)-vector, whose i-th entry (i = 0, ..., n) is the value of the function on an input vector with i ones. Mathematically, the symmetric Boolean functions correspond one-to-one with the functions that map n+1 elements to two elements, .

Symmetric Boolean functions are used to classify Boolean satisfiability problems.

Special cases

A number of special cases are recognized:

Majority function: their value is 1 on input vectors with more than n/2 ones
Threshold functions: their value is 1 on input vectors with k or more ones for a fixed k
All-equal and not-all-equal function: their values is 1 when the inputs do (not) all have the same value
Exact-count functions: their value is 1 on input vectors with k ones for a fixed k
One-hot or 1-in-n function: their value is 1 on input vectors with exactly one one
One-cold function: their value is 1 on input vectors with exactly one zero
 Congruence functions: their value is 1 on input vectors with the number of ones congruent to k mod m for fixed k, m
Parity function: their value is 1 if the input vector has odd number of ones
The n-ary versions of AND, OR, XOR, NAND, NOR and XNOR are also symmetric Boolean functions.

Properties 
In the following,  denotes the value of the function  when applied to an input vector of weight .

Weight 
The weight of the function can be calculated from its value vector:

Algebraic normal form 

The algebraic normal form either contains all monomials of certain order , or none of them; i.e. the Möbius transform  of the function is also a symmetric function. It can thus also be described by a simple (n+1) bit vector, the ANF vector . The ANF and value vectors are related by a Möbius relation:where  denotes all the weights k whose base-2 representation is covered by the base-2 representation of m (a consequence of Lucas’ theorem). Effectively, an n-variable symmetric Boolean function corresponds to a log(n)-variable ordinary Boolean function acting on the base-2 representation of the input weight.

For example, for three-variable functions:

So the three variable majority function with value vector (0, 0, 1, 1) has ANF vector (0, 0, 1, 0), i.e.:

Unit hypercube polynomial 

Examples

See also 

 Symmetric function

References

Boolean algebra
Cryptography